Meinig Glove Factory-E. Richard Meinig, Co., also known as Ellmar Mills, was a historic factory complex and national historic district located in Reading, Berks County, Pennsylvania.  The district included two properties with six buildings, four of which were contributing. All buildings were constructed of brick. Buildings A and B were built by 1906.  Building A was a four-story, "L"-shaped building, with a seven-story section.  Building Bwas a two-story, rectangular building measuring 130 feet by 25 feet.  Building C was a one-story building measuring 190 feet by 55 feet, and Building D was a four-story, with basement, building measuring 45 feet by 118 feet.  The buildings were demolished by 2011.

It was listed on the National Register of Historic Places in 1985.   It is located in the Queen Anne Historic District.

References

Historic districts on the National Register of Historic Places in Pennsylvania
Industrial buildings and structures on the National Register of Historic Places in Pennsylvania
Industrial buildings completed in 1905
Buildings and structures in Berks County, Pennsylvania
National Register of Historic Places in Reading, Pennsylvania
1905 establishments in Pennsylvania